This is a list of singles that have peaked in the Top 10 of the Billboard Hot 100 during 1985.

Phil Collins and Madonna each had five top-ten hits in 1985, tying them for the most top-ten hits during the year.

Top-ten singles

1984 peaks

1986 peaks

See also
 1985 in music
 List of Hot 100 number-one singles of 1985 (U.S.)
 Billboard Year-End Hot 100 singles of 1985

References

General sources

Joel Whitburn Presents the Billboard Hot 100 Charts: The Eighties
Additional information obtained can be verified within Billboard's online archive services and print editions of the magazine.

1985
United States Hot 100 Top 10